The Anglican Diocese of Enugu  North is one of 12 within the Anglican Province of Enugu, itself one of 14 provinces within the Church of Nigeria. The pioneer and current bishop is Sosthenes Eze, appointed in 2007. Eze was consecrated a bishop on March 4, 2007, at the Cathedral of the Advent, Abuja; and the missionary diocese was inaugurated on March 16 at St Mary's Cathedral, Ngwo.

References

Church of Nigeria dioceses
Dioceses of the Province of Enugu